The Dirt Soundtrack is the soundtrack album to the 2019 biographical film of the same name by Mötley Crüe, inspired by the book The Dirt: Confessions of the World's Most Notorious Rock Band by the band and Neil Strauss. It was their tenth compilation album. The soundtrack was released by Mötley Records and Eleven Seven Records on March 22, 2019, on CD, LP, and digital formats. It is the band’s first release in over a decade since their 2009 Greatest Hits album.

Background
"There's no new music to be made for it," Nikki Sixx declared in 2016, when financing for the film had yet to be finalised. "No reason for it. And if it comes down to [adopts the voice of a record label person], 'Well, you have a new movie – you need to write new music for the movie,' I'm like, 'I'm sorry, but that's cheap.' We don't want to get back into the studio and go, 'We have to write a song, for marketing.' I want to write music because it's real."

On February 22, 2019, Mötley Crüe and Machine Gun Kelly (who plays Tommy Lee in the film) released the video for the song "The Dirt (Est. 1981)" on their YouTube channel. The band announced that the film's soundtrack would also feature three new recordings, all produced with longtime collaborator Bob Rock: "Ride with the Devil", "Crash and Burn", and a cover of Madonna's "Like a Virgin".

For the new songs, the band collaborated with Machine Gun Kelly, John 5, and Sahaj. They composed nine songs, but narrowed them down to the three tracks featured in the soundtrack.

In 2019, "The Dirt (Est. 1981)" was featured on the soundtrack for the video game WWE 2K20.

Commercial performance
The soundtrack reached No. 10 on the Billboard 200, making it the band's first top-10 album since Saints of Los Angeles charted at No. 4 on July 4, 2008.

Track listing

Songs not included in the soundtrack, but featured in the film include the following:

 The Jaynetts – "Cry Behind the Daisies"
 T. Rex – "Solid Gold Easy Action"
 Death – "Keep on Knocking"
 Gary Charlson – "Close Enough"
 The Kind – "Total Insanity"
 Billy Squier – "My Kinda Lover"
 Kim Wilde – "Chequered Love"
 Jimmy Carter and the Dallas County Green – "A Night of Love"
 The Colors – "Go Go Getter"
 Heat Exchange – "Philosophy"
 Goliath – "Hot Rock and Thunder"
 Jonathan Elias and John Petersen – "Man on the Moon"
 Liquid Blue – "Big Money"
 Nu Shooz – "I Can't Wait"
 Meghan Kabir – "Live Wire"
 Johnny Thunders – "You Can't Put Your Arms Around a Memory"

Charts

Album

Year-end charts

The Dirt Single

References

External links

Mötley Crüe compilation albums
2019 soundtrack albums
Eleven Seven Label Group compilation albums
Mötley Crüe soundtracks
2019 compilation albums
Eleven Seven Label Group soundtracks
Biographical film soundtracks
Comedy film soundtracks
Drama film soundtracks